H.G. Stoker may refer to:
Hendrik G. Stoker (1899–1993), South African Calvinist philosopher
Henry Hugh Gordon Stoker (1885-1966), British naval officer and actor